Players and pairs who neither have high enough rankings nor receive wild cards may participate in a qualifying tournament held one week before the annual Wimbledon Tennis Championships.

Seeds

  Eric Butorac /  Chris Drake (first round)
  Flavio Cipolla /  Mirko Pehar (first round)
  Jeff Morrison /  Rajeev Ram (first round)
  Rik de Voest /  Nathan Healey (first round)
  Rohan Bopanna /  Johan Landsberg (first round)
  Sanchai Ratiwatana /  Sonchat Ratiwatana (qualifying competition, lucky losers)
  Alessandro Motti /  Jasper Smit (first round)
  Ramón Delgado /  André Sá (qualified)

Qualifiers

  Irakli Labadze /  Dušan Vemić
  Neil Bamford /  Jim May
  Ramón Delgado /  André Sá
  Kevin Kim /  Cecil Mamiit

Lucky losers

  Sanchai Ratiwatana /  Sonchat Ratiwatana
  Zack Fleishman /  Robert Smeets
  Tomáš Cakl /  Pavel Šnobel
  Frédéric Niemeyer /  Glenn Weiner

Qualifying draw

First qualifier

Second qualifier

Third qualifier

Fourth qualifier

External links

2006 Wimbledon Championships – Men's draws and results at the International Tennis Federation
Official Results Archive (ATP)

Men's doubles qualifying
2006